The 4707th Air Defense Wing is a discontinued United States Air Force organization. Its last assignment was with the 26th Air Division of Air Defense Command (ADC) at Otis Air Force Base, Massachusetts where it was discontinued in 1956.

The wing was established in 1952 at Otis as the 4707th Defense Wing in a general reorganization of ADC, which replaced wings responsible for a base with wings responsible for a geographical area. It assumed control of several fighter Interceptor squadrons that had been assigned to the 33d Fighter-Interceptor Wing. In early 1953 it also was assigned six radar squadrons in New England, some of which were Air National Guard squadrons mobilized for the Korean War and its dispersed fighter squadrons were combined with colocated air base squadrons into air defense groups. The wing was discontinued in 1956 and its units transferred to other ADC commands, primarily the 33d Fighter Wing for units at Otis and the 26th Air Division for units at other locations.

History

Origin

The wing was organized at the beginning of February 1952 as part of a major reorganization of Air Defense Command (ADC) fighter units responding to ADC's difficulty under the existing wing base organizational structure in deploying fighter squadrons to best advantage. The wing replaced the 33d Fighter-Interceptor Wing (FIW) at Otis Air Force Base, Massachusetts five days later and assumed control of the 33 FIW's operational elements. The wing's 564th Air Base Group assumed support responsibilities for Otis AFB from the inactivating 33d Air Base Group and 33d Maintenance & Supply Groups. The operational squadrons transferred from the 33d FIW were the 58th Fighter-Interceptor Squadron (FIS) and 59th FIS at Otis AFB and the 60th FIS at Westover Air Force Base, Massachusetts. The 58th and 60th FIS flew F-86 Sabre aircraft, while the 59th FIS was equipped with F-94 Starfire aircraft. The wing also was assigned a federalized Air National Guard (ANG) squadron from the 101st FIW, the 133d FIS at Grenier Air Force Base, New Hampshire, flying World War II era F-47 Thunderbolt aircraft. The wing mission was to train and maintain tactical flying units in state of readiness in order to defend the northeastern United States.

Shortly after joining the wing, the 58th FIS converted from F-86 to F-94 aircraft. Although it remained assigned to the wing until February 1953, the 59th FIS moved to Goose Bay Airport, Labrador on 28 October 1952 and was detached from the wing to Northeast Air Command until it was reassigned. In November its place at Otis was taken by the newly activating 437th FIS. The same month the 48th FIS activated at Grenier to replace the 133d FIS, which was inactivated and returned to the control of the ANG.

1953–1954 changes

The wing was reassigned to 32d Air Division as part of complete reorganization of Eastern Air Defense Force in February 1953. This reorganization also resulted in the activation of Air Defense Groups at ADC fighter bases, and the new groups assumed direct command of the fighter squadrons at these stations. The 564th Air Base Group redesignated as the 564th Air Defense Group and the 58th FIS was reassigned to it at Otis, The 518th Air Defense Group activated at Niagara Falls Municipal Airport, New York and was assigned the 47th FIS, which had been assigned to another wing.

Another result of this reorganization is that the wing assumed the radar detection, warning, and control mission and assigned six Aircraft Control & Warning Squadrons (AC&W Sq) to perform this mission. Two of these squadrons, the 113th AC&W Sq and the 119th AC&W Sq, were federalized ANG squadrons, which were returned to state control in December, while their personnel and equipment were transferred to the 700th AC&W Sq. In the spring of 1953, five new AC&W Sqs were activated at Grenier AFB for transfer to stations in Canada. These squadrons were all reassigned to Northeast Air Command shortly after their activation. The 614th AC&W Sq moved to Georgia and was reassigned later in December.

The wing was assigned an additional Air Defense Group in September 1954 when the 4700th Air Base Group at Stewart Air Force Base, New York was assigned an operational fighter squadron and redesignated the 4700th Air Defense Group. The 4707th was also assigned an additional radar unit two months later.

Project Arrow and replacement

In 1955, ADC implemented Project Arrow, which was designed to bring back on the active list the fighter units which had compiled memorable records in the two world wars. As a result of Project Arrow, the 15th Fighter Group (Air Defense) replaced the 518th Air Defense Group at Niagara Falls, the 33d Fighter Group (Air Defense) replaced the 564th Air Defense Group at Otis. The 4700th Air Defense Group at Stewart was replaced by the 329th Fighter Group (Air Defense), although the 329th group was assigned to another wing until mid-1956 due to shifting areas of air defense responsibility.

Because Project Arrow called for fighter squadrons to be assigned to their traditional group headquarters, the 60th FIS at Westover returned to Otis and was replaced at Westover by the 337th Fighter-Interceptor Squadron, which took over its personnel and aircraft. Later in 1955, the wing assumed command of two other fighter squadrons, the 49th FIS at Laurence G. Hanscom Airport, Massachusetts, and the 324th FIS, which activated at Westover. Both squadrons flew F-86D aircraft.

The wing was reassigned to the 26th Air Division in March 1956 when the 26th Air Division region of responsibility was extended, resulting in reassignment of radar and interceptor aircraft units as well. Shortly thereafter, ADC reactivated Fighter Wings at its large installations and the 4707th was discontinued later that year with its equipment and personnel being reassigned to the unit it had originally replaced, now designated the 33d Fighter Wing (Air Defense).

Lineage
 Designated as the 4707th Defense Wing and organized on 1 February 1952
 Redesignated 4707th Air Defense Wing on 1 September 1954
 Discontinued on 18 October 1956

Assignments
 Eastern Air Defense Force, 1 February 1952
 32d Air Division, 16 February 1953
 26th Air Division, 1 March – 18 October 1956

Components
If no station is given, units were at Otis Air Force Base.

Groups

Fighter groups
 15th Fighter Group (Air Defense)
 Niagara Falls Airport, New York, 18 August 1955 – 1 March 1956
 33d Fighter Group (Air Defense), 18 August 1955 – 18 October 1956
 52d Fighter Group (Air Defense)
 Suffolk County Air Force Base, New York, 1 March 1956 – 8 July 1956
 329th Fighter Group (Air Defense)
 Stewart AFB, New York, 8 July 1956 – 18 October 1956

Air defense groups
 518th Air Defense Group
 Niagara Falls Airport, New York, 16 February 1953 – 18 August 1955
 564th Air Base Group (later 564th Air Defense Group), 1 February 1952 – 18 August 1955
 4700th Air Defense Group, 20 September 1954 – 18 August 1955
 Stewart Air Force Base, New York, 20 September 1954 – 18 August 1955

Squadrons

Fighter squadrons

 47th Fighter-Interceptor Squadron
 Niagara Falls Municipal Airport, New York, 1 December 1952 – 16 February 1953
 48th Fighter-Interceptor Squadron
 Grenier Air Force Base, New Hampshire, 1 November 1952 – 14 January 1953
 49th Fighter-Interceptor Squadron
 Laurence G. Hanscom Airport, Massachusetts, 15 November 1955 – 16 June 1956
 58th Fighter-Interceptor Squadron, 6 February 1952 – 16 February 1953
 59th Fighter-Interceptor Squadron, 6 February 1952 – 1 February 1953

 60th Fighter-Interceptor Squadron
 Westover Air Force Base, Massachusetts, 6 February 1952 – 18 August 1955
 133d Fighter-Interceptor Squadron
 Grenier Air Force Base, New Hampshire, 6 February 1952 – 1 November 1952
 324th Fighter-Interceptor Squadron
 Westover Air Force Base, Massachusetts, 18 October 1955 – 18 October 1956
 337th Fighter-Interceptor Squadron
 Westover Air Force Base, Massachusetts, 18 August 1955 – 18 October 1955
 437th Fighter-Interceptor Squadron, 27 November 1952 – 16 February 1953

Support squadrons

 76th Air Base Squadron
 Niagara Falls Municipal Airport, New York, 1 February 1952 – 18 February 1953

 4681st Air Base Squadron
 Grenier Air Force Base, New Hampshire, 1 February 1952 – 16 February 1953

Radar squadrons

 113th Aircraft Control & Warning Squadron
 Grenier Air Force Base, New Hampshire, 16 February 1953 – 1 December 1953
 119th Aircraft Control & Warning Squadron, 16 February 1953 – 1 December 1953
 614th Aircraft Control & Warning Squadron
 Grenier Air Force Base, New Hampshire, 16 February 1953 – 24 December 1953
 644th Aircraft Control & Warning Squadron
 Syracuse Air Force Station, New York, 1 October 1954 – July 1955, Portsmouth (later Rye AFS), New Hampshire – 18 October 1956
 648th Aircraft Control & Warning Squadron
 Benton Air Force Station, Pennsylvania, 8 July 1956 – 18 October 1956
 654th Aircraft Control & Warning Squadron
 Brunswick Naval Air Station, Maine, 16 February 1953 – 1 March 1956
 656th Aircraft Control & Warning Squadron
 Schuylerville (later Saratoga Springs AFS), New York, 16 February 1953 – 18 October 1956
 700th Aircraft Control & Warning Squadron
 Grenier Air Force Base, New Hampshire, 1 December 1953 – 1 May 1954

 762d Aircraft Control & Warning Squadron
 North Truro Air Force Station, Massachusetts, 16 February 1953 – 18 October 1956
 763d Aircraft Control & Warning Squadron
 Shawnee (later Lockport Air Force Station), New York, 16 February 1953 – 1 July 1956
 773d Aircraft Control & Warning Squadron
 Montauk Air Force Station, New York, 1 March 1956 – 18 October 1956
 921st Aircraft Control & Warning Squadron
 Grenier Air Force Base, 26 May 1953 – 1 October 1953
 922d Aircraft Control & Warning Squadron
 Grenier Air Force Base, 26 May 1953 – 1 October 1953
 923d Aircraft Control & Warning Squadron
 Grenier Air Force Base, 13 June 1953 – 1 November 1953
 924th Aircraft Control & Warning Squadron
 Grenier Air Force Base, 13 June 1953 – 1 December 1953
 926th Aircraft Control & Warning Squadron
 Grenier Air Force Base, 13 June 1953 – 1 December 1953

Stations
 Otis Air Force Base, Massachusetts, 6 February 1952 – 18 October 1956

Aircraft

 F-47D, 1952–1953
 F-80C, 1952–1953

 F-86A, 1952
 F-86D, 1953–1956
 F-86E, 1952–1953

 F-89D, 1955–1956
 F-89H, 1956

 F-94B, 1952–1953
 F-94C, 1953–1955

See also
 List of MAJCOM wings
 List of United States Air Force Aerospace Defense Command Interceptor Squadrons
 List of United States Air Force aircraft control and warning squadrons

References

Notes

Bibliography

 Buss, Lydus H.(ed), Sturm, Thomas A., Volan, Denys, and McMullen, Richard F., History of Continental Air Defense Command and Air Defense Command July to December 1955, Directorate of Historical Services, Air Defense Command, Ent AFB, CO, (1956)
 
  Grant, C.L., (1961)  The Development of Continental Air Defense to 1 September 1954, USAF Historical Study No. 126

Further reading
 
 
 

4707
Air defense wings of the United States Air Force
Military units and formations established in 1952
Military units and formations disestablished in 1956
Military units and formations in Massachusetts